"Twenty Foreplay" is a song by American singer-songwriter Janet Jackson from her first greatest hits album, Design of a Decade: 1986–1996 (1995). It was released as the album's second and final single on January 8, 1996.

Song information
The song starts off as a soulful ballad before changing to a mid-tempo R&B groove. The title is a play on the word "foreplay" and "24 hours a day". The U.S. version of "Twenty Foreplay" is lengthier than the international version which was edited in order to fit two more songs on the international release of Design of a Decade: 1986–1996. The Slow Jam Fantasy Mix was produced by Jorge Corante and is the complete version of the song which contains an extra second verse.

Critical reception
British magazine Music Week rated the song three out of five, adding, "A pleasant, slinky ballad which is already receiving plenty of support from TV and radio, but it doesn't have even the hint of a hook."

Chart performance
"Twenty Foreplay" saw moderate success in Europe, peaking at number twenty-two in the United Kingdom, but fared better on the UK R&B Chart, peaking at number 5. It peaked at  number forty-one in the Netherlands (on the physical sales-based Single Top 100 chart), and number seventy-four in Germany. It fared better in Australia, where it reached the top thirty. It charted inside the top thirty-five in Scotland and the Billboard Hot R&B/Hip-Hop Airplay chart, but was unable to enter the Billboard Hot 100 or the Hot R&B/Hip-Hop Songs as the song was not given a commercial release in the United States.

Music video
The 1950s look of the video was inspired by Dorothy Dandridge, whom Jackson considers to be America's first African American sex symbol. The video was shot in black-and-white and features Jackson as a film actress living the glamorous Hollywood life such as attending a movie premiere and a press conference, intercut with footage of her singing on the backlot of a movie set. The video was released commercially on the two-CD + DVD  compilation  Japanese Singles Collection: Greatest Hits (2022).

Live performances
Jackson sang "Twenty Foreplay" live for the first time on her 2017 State of the World Tour. Accompanied by two back-up singers, the singer performed the song while sitting on a stool dressed in a loose denim jacket, sweatpants and a flannel shirt tied around her waist. Andrew Barker from Variety magazine said it showcased "perhaps the boldest of her three costume changes" during the show. Through the performance of the song, he was also able to note that her voice, "though strong, [it] isn't always the most layered of instruments, but it has a softness and a lilting sweetness that she managed to emphasize while still projecting well enough to cut through the clatter".

Track listings and formats
UK CD Single
 "Twenty Foreplay (Slow Jam International Edit)" – 4:26
 "The Pleasure Principle (Legendary Radio Mix)" – 4:17
 "Alright (CJ Radio)" – 3:52
 "The Pleasure Principle (Legendary Club Mix)" – 8:15
Europe CD Single
 "Twenty Foreplay (Slow Jam International Edit)" – 4:26
 "Runaway (Jam & Lewis Street Mix Edit)" – 3:23
 "Runaway (Jam & Lewis Ghetto Mix)" – 4:54
 "Twenty Foreplay (Slow Jam Video Edit)" – 4:50
Remixes CD Single
 "Twenty Foreplay (Radio Club Mix Edit)" – 3:42
 "Twenty Foreplay (Junior's Jungle Club Mix)" – 9:56
 "Twenty Foreplay (Radio Club Mix)" – 5:02
 "Runaway (G-Man's Hip Hop Mix)" – 4:14

Remixes

Slow Jam Mixes
 "Twenty Foreplay (Slow Jam Mix)" – 4:50
 "Twenty Foreplay (Slow Jam Video Edit)" – 4:50
 "Twenty Foreplay (Slow Jam International Edit)" – 4:26
 "Twenty Foreplay (Slow Jam Bedtime Mix)" – 6:20	
 "Twenty Foreplay (Slow Jam Fantasy Mix)" – 6:20
 "Twenty Foreplay (Slow Jam Fantasy Edit)" – 5:20 
Junior Vasquez Mixes
 "Twenty Foreplay (Junior's Jungle Club Mix)" – 9:56
 "Twenty Foreplay (Junior's Dub)" – 9:01
 "Twenty Foreplay (Radio Club Mix)" – 5:02
 "Twenty Foreplay (Radio Club Mix Edit)" – 3:42
 "Twenty Foreplay (Tribal Vocal Mix)" – 7:00
 "Twenty Foreplay (The Raw Dub)" – 7:00

Charts

References

1990s ballads
1995 songs
1996 singles
Janet Jackson songs
Contemporary R&B ballads
Songs written by Janet Jackson
Songs written by Jimmy Jam and Terry Lewis
Song recordings produced by Jimmy Jam and Terry Lewis
Black-and-white music videos
Music videos directed by Keir McFarlane
Soul ballads